Francis Xavier "Moose" Goheen (February 8, 1894 – November 13, 1979) was an American amateur ice hockey forward. While enrolled at the Valparaiso University, Goheen was a skilled, three-sport athlete competing in football and baseball, in addition to hockey. Goheen was a member of the St. Paul Athletic Club team that won United States Amateur Hockey championship and received the MacNaughton Cup in the 1915–16 season. After that season, Goheen enlisted in the United States Army and served in the European theatre during World War I in the Army's signal corps. After his service in the Army, Goheen returned to the St. Paul Athletic Club and won a second league championship and MacNaughton Cup in 1920. Goheen also competed in the 1920 Summer Olympics as the captain and rover for the American ice hockey team, which won the silver medal. Outside of hockey, Goheen was dedicated to his career with the Northern States Power Company in St. Paul, so much so that he declined to play with United States Olympic hockey team in the 1924 Winter Olympics and spurned multiple contract offers to play in the National Hockey League with the Boston Bruins (in 1926) and Toronto Maple Leafs.

In 1952, Moose Goheen was inducted to the Hockey Hall of Fame; at the time, he was only the second American to have been inducted (after Hobey Baker) and the first Minnesotan. He was also elected to the Minnesota Sports Hall of Fame in 1958 and to the United States Hockey Hall of Fame in 1973. In 1924, in a 1–0 victory over Boston for the St. Paul Saints, Goheen scored a goal using a slap shot—the earliest record of the feat.

The White Bear Lake Area Hockey Association holds yearly tournaments in Goheen's name.

Career statistics

Regular season and playoffs

International

References

External links

dataOlympics profile

1894 births
1979 deaths
American men's ice hockey forwards
Buffalo Majors players
Central Hockey League (1925–1926) players
Hockey Hall of Fame inductees
Ice hockey players from Minnesota
Ice hockey players at the 1920 Summer Olympics
Medalists at the 1920 Summer Olympics
Olympic silver medalists for the United States in ice hockey
People from White Bear Lake, Minnesota
St. Paul Athletic Club ice hockey players
St. Paul Saints (AHA) players
United States Hockey Hall of Fame inductees